Jonathan Kléver Caicedo Cepeda (born 28 April 1993) is an Ecuadorian professional road racing cyclist, who currently rides for UCI WorldTeam .

Career
Caicedo is from the town of Santa Martha de Cuba in Ecuador's Tulcán Canton, from which he gets his nickname, Cubanito ("Little Cuban"). Whilst at school, Caicedo was a member of a cycling club founded by one of his teachers, former Olympic racing cyclist Juan Carlos Rosero. The club has also produced a number of other professional riders, including Richard Carapaz and Jhonatan Narváez.

In May 2019, he was named in the startlist for the 2019 Giro d'Italia. The following month, he won both the road race and the time trial in the Ecuadorian National Road Championships. Caicedo was again selected by EF for the 2020 Giro d'Italia, where he won the race's third stage, forming part of the day's early breakaway before dropping the remainder of the breakaway riders alongside Giovanni Visconti in the closing stages before dropping Visconti with an attack and reaching the summit finish on Mount Etna alone, additionally taking the lead in the mountains classification.

Major results
Source:

2015
 National Road Championships
1st  Time trial
3rd Road race
2016
 1st  Road race, Pan American Road Championships
 1st Stage 12 Vuelta a Costa Rica
 2nd Time trial, National Road Championships
2017
 4th Overall Vuelta a Colombia
2018
 1st  Overall Vuelta a Colombia
 2nd Overall Vuelta a Asturias
1st  Points classification
 3rd Overall Vuelta a la Comunidad de Madrid
 6th Winston-Salem Cycling Classic
2019
 National Road Championships
1st  Road race
1st  Time trial
 4th Overall Adriatica Ionica Race
2020
 Giro d'Italia
1st Stage 3
Held  after Stages 3–4
 3rd Overall Tour Colombia
1st Stage 1 (TTT)
2022
 3rd Road race, National Road Championships
 4th Overall Vuelta a Castilla y León
2023
 1st  Time trial, National Road Championships

Grand Tour general classification results timeline

References

External links

1993 births
Living people
Ecuadorian male cyclists
People from Carchi Province
Ecuadorian Giro d'Italia stage winners
21st-century Ecuadorian people